Sport Club Belém, commonly known as Sport Belém, is a Brazilian football club based in Belém, Pará state. They competed in the Série B twice.

History
The club was founded on December 2, 1965. They competed in the Série B for the first time in 1971, when they were eliminated in the First Stage, and in 1986, when they were again eliminated in the First Stage.

Stadium

Sport Club Belém play their home games at Estádio Olímpico do Pará, nicknamed Mangueirão. The stadium has a maximum capacity of 45,007 people.

References

Association football clubs established in 1965
Football clubs in Pará
1965 establishments in Brazil